Mountain Grove is a city in Wright County and Texas County in the U.S. state of Missouri. It lies within the Ozarks in the south-central part of the state. The population was 4,313 at the 2020 census.

History
A post office called Mountain Grove has been in operation since 1875. The community owes its present name to a stand of trees near the original elevated town site.

In 1841 a settlement was built on land east of Mountain Grove near a spring in a grove of hickory timber. A post office was established in Hickory Spring in 1853. The post office, in 1878, was named for Judge Robert W. Fyan, a prominent figure in early county history. In 1859, a general store was built at the crossroads about one mile west of Hickory Spring. The old post office established under the name of Fyan before the Civil War changed to Mountain Grove, with reference to its location on a ridge in a grove of trees, in 1878.

On March 9, 1862 there was a skirmish in the town. 

One of the most famous incidents in Mountain Grove occurred in the middle of May 1883, when what was called a "nipping frost" caused every tree, sapling and shrub in the community of Fyan and the Fyan depot to be cut clean as from an axe. Thus, the joining of Mountain Grove and adjoining Fyan occurred. In June, the name of the depot was changed to Mountain Grove. The town reapplied for a charter in 1886, changed its boundaries and held its first election.

Buildings within or near the city listed on the National Register of Historic Places include the Administration Building, Missouri State Fruit Experiment Station, Mountain Grove Bandstand, and Mountain Grove City Hall.

Geography
Mountain Grove is located in the Ozarks, along the south edge of the Salem Plateau. The community is served by US Route 60 and Missouri Route 95. The community is mostly within Wright County, with the eastern portion extending into Texas County. The town sits on the drainage divide between the White River tributaries to the south and the Missouri River tributaries  to the north.

The city of Mountain Grove is also directly on the border with neighboring Texas County.

Climate

Demographics

2010 census
As of the census of 2010, there were 4,789 people, 2,008 households, and 1,217 families living in the city. The racial makeup of the city was 96.4% White, 0.3% African American, 1.0% Native American, 0.4% Asian, 0.3% from other races, and 1.6% from two or more races. Hispanic or Latino of any race were 2.2% of the population.

There were 2,008 households, of which 32.3% had children under the age of 18 living with them, 40.8% were married couples living together, 14.5% had a female householder with no husband present, 5.3% had a male householder with no wife present, and 39.4% were non-families. 34.4% of all households were made up of individuals, and 16.2% had someone living alone who was 65 years of age or older. The average household size was 2.34 and the average family size was 3.02.

The median age in the city was 37.7 years. 26.7% of residents were under the age of 18; 9.3% were between the ages of 18 and 24; 22% were from 25 to 44; 22.9% were from 45 to 64; and 19.1% were 65 years of age or older. The gender makeup of the city was 46.3% male and 53.7% female.

2000 census
As of the census of 2000, there were 4,574 people, 1,976 households, and 1,235 families living in the city. The population density was 1,091.6 people per square mile (421.5/km). There were 2,244 housing units at an average density of 535.5 per square mile (206.8/km). The racial makeup of the city was 97.44% White, 0.17% African American, 0.61% Native American, 0.09% Asian, 0.48% from other races, and 1.20% from two or more races. Hispanic or Latino of any race were 1.09% of the population.

There were 1,976 households, out of which 29.4% had children under the age of 18 living with them, 46.4% were married couples living together, 12.4% had a female householder with no husband present, and 37.5% were non-families. 34.5% of all households were made up of individuals, and 17.9% had someone living alone who was 65 years of age or older. The average household size was 2.26 and the average family size was 2.88.

In the city the population was spread out, with 25.7% under the age of 18, 9.1% from 18 to 24, 24.1% from 25 to 44, 20.8% from 45 to 64, and 20.3% who were 65 years of age or older. The median age was 38 years. For every 100 females there were 80.4 males. For every 100 females age 18 and over, there were 76.1 males.

The median income for a household in the city was $21,131, and the median income for a family was $25,927. Males had a median income of $24,913 versus $17,003 for females. The per capita income for the city was $13,508. About 22.9% of families and 28.2% of the population were below the poverty line, including 38.1% of those under age 18 and 18.0% of those age 65 or over.
Today, Mountain Grove is the most populated city in Wright County, Missouri

Government
The City of Mountain Grove is a 4th-class city and operates with a Mayor/Board of Aldermen form of Government. The City Administrator is the chief administrative officer of the city and oversees all operations. All department supervisors report directly to them. The Mayor/Board of Aldermen set policies and pass ordinances.

The current mayor of the city is Fred VanBibber.

As of August 2020: each Alderpersons is elected for a 2 year term.

Education
Mountain Grove public schools are a class 3A school in Missouri, including one elementary grades Pre-K through 4th, one middle school grades 5th–8th, and one high school grades 9th–12th.  Mountain Grove High School also houses Ozark Mountain Technical Center, which allows students to gain technology skills necessary for vocational career paths.

Mountain Grove Christian Academy has approximately 68 students, grade Pre-K through 12th.

Missouri State University operates the  Missouri State Fruit Experiment Station in Mountain Grove.  The station includes the Center for Grapevine Biotechnology and the Mountain Grove Cellars. It is associated primarily with the university's Plant Science master's degree Program.

Mountain Grove has a public library, a branch of the Wright County Library.

Notable people
 Don Faurot (1902–1995), head coach for the University of Missouri football team, as well as longtime athletic director, was born there.
 Hooks Iott (1919-1980), Major League Baseball player for the St. Louis Browns and New York Giants during the 1940s.
 Paul McDonald Robinett (1893–1975), Brigadier General, U.S. Army, was born in Mountain Grove and is buried there.

References

External links

 Mountain Grove Schools
 Historic maps of Mountain Grove in the Sanborn Maps of Missouri Collection at the University of Missouri
 City Government of Mountain Grove
Mountain Grove Chamber – Mountain Grove, MO
Mountain Grove News-Journal : Serving The Tri-County Area Since 1882!

Cities in Wright County, Missouri
Cities in Texas County, Missouri
Cities in Missouri